The Taiwan Provincial Consultative Council (TPCC) was the council of the streamlined Taiwan Province of the Republic of China. In July 2018, all duties of the Taiwan Provincial Government and TPCC were transferred to the National Development Council and other ministries of the Executive Yuan.

History
Taiwan Provincial Consultative Council was originally established on 1 May 1946 as Taiwan Representative Council. It was renamed Provisional Taiwan Provincial Council in December 1951 and Taiwan Provincial Council in June 1959. As all council members were democratically elected, until 1991 National Assembly election and 1992 legislative election, it was the most recognized democratic legislature in Taiwan.

In 1996, President Lee Teng-hui decided to abolish most of the governmental functions of Taiwan Province. It was reconstituted as Taiwan Provincial Consultative Council with the streamlining of the Taiwan Provincial Government in 1998.

On July 1, 2018, by a resolution passed during the 3606th meeting of the Executive Yuan, all the remaining duties were transferred to the National Development Council and other ministries of the Executive Yuan. The transformations completed before 31 December 2018. However, the government will keep the position of Chairman Speaker of Taiwan Provincial Consultative Council to comply with the requirement set by the Additional Articles of the Constitution.

Council structure 
Currently, the only official who serves in the council is the Chairman Speaker of Taiwan Provincial Consultative Council.

The consultative council does not have any physical meeting place after all its functionalities were handed to the central government in 2018. Historically, the consultative council was located in Taipei from April 1946 to May 1958, and in Wufeng, Taichung County (now Taichung special municipality and not a part of Taiwan Province) from May 1958 to 2018.

Speakers of Taiwan Provincial Council (1946-1998)
  (28 February 1946 – 1 June 1963)
 Hsieh Tung-min (2 June 1963 – 31 January 1973)
  (1 February 1973 – 19 December 1981)
 Kao Yu-jen (20 December 1981 – 19 December 1989)
 Chien Ming-ching (20 December 1989 – 19 December 1994)
 Liu Ping-wei (20 December 1994 – 19 December 1998)

Speakers of Taiwan Provincial Consultative Council (1998–2018)
  (20 December 1998 – 20 May 2000)
 Peng Tien-fu (13 June 2000 – 20 December 2001)
 Fan Chen-tsung (21 December 2001 – 31 January 2002)
 Yu Lin-ya (1 February 2002 – 19 January 2009)
 Lee Yuan-chuan (20 January 2009 – 20 December 2016)
 Cheng Yung-chin (21 December 2016 – 30 June 2018)

See also
 Legislative Yuan
 Urban Council and Regional Council of Hong Kong

References

1946 establishments in Taiwan
2018 disestablishments in Taiwan
Local governments of the Republic of China
Defunct organizations based in Taiwan
Government agencies disestablished in 2018